The Rason Ministry was the 8th Ministry of the Government of Western Australia and was led by Ministerialist Premier Hector Rason. It succeeded the Daglish Ministry on 25 August 1905 after the previous Labor minority administration fell on a vote of no confidence. On 7 May 1906, it was followed by the Moore Ministry led by Minister for Lands Newton Moore.

On 25 August 1905, the Governor, Admiral Sir Frederick Bedford, designated 6 principal executive offices of the Government under section 43(2) of the Constitution Acts Amendment Act 1899. The following ministers were then appointed to the positions, and served until the end of the Ministry.

References

  (no ISBN)

Western Australian ministries
Ministries of Edward VII